Lishe Station is an underground metro station in Ningbo, Zhejiang, China. It situates on Airport Road. Construction of the station starts in December 2010 and opened to service in September 26, 2015.

Exits 
Lishe Station has 2 exits.

References 

Railway stations in Zhejiang
Railway stations in China opened in 2015
Ningbo Rail Transit stations